"Goin Baby" is a song by American rapper DaBaby, released on March 1, 2019, as the third track from his debut studio album Baby on Baby.

Background
In an interview with Rolling Stone, DaBaby explained the song's title, saying, "Anything that you do [to] the best it could be done, you goin' baby... Anything that you do exceedingly well you goin' baby."

Music video
The music video was released on March 25, 2019, and directed by Reel Goats. In it, DaBaby is seen on a private jet with many dolls, as well as at Times Square with "life-size baby blow-up suits".

Charts

Certifications

References

2019 songs
DaBaby songs
Songs written by DaBaby